Ferdo Godina (17 October 1912 – 14 July 1994) was a Slovene writer and partisan. He was one of the early activists in the battle against the Hungarian occupation of Prekmurje during the Second World War. He wrote novels and short stories and was also a prolific writer for children and young adults.

Godina was born in 1912 in Dolnja Bistrica in what was then the Slovene March of the Kingdom of Hungary and part of Austria-Hungary and is part of Prekmurje in Slovenia. He joined the partisans in 1941. He wrote mostly short stories, socially sensitive and often written in the first-person narrative. He also published numerous works for young readers. He died in Ljubljana in 1994. The Bistrica Cultural Society is named after Godina.

He won the Levstik Award in 1974 for his series of stories for children Sezidala si bova hišico (We Shall Build a House).

Published works

For Adult Readers  
 Bele tulpike (White Tulips), 1945
 Iz partizanskih let: izbor proze (From the Partisan Years: Selected Prose), 1947
 Krivda Jarčekove Kristine (Kristina Jarček's Guilt), 1955
 Mi otroci vojne  (We, Children of War), 1962
 Viragova Verona (Verona Virag), 1966
 Spomini na partizanska leta (Memoirs of the Partisan Years), 1961, 1963
 Prekmurje 1941 – 1945 prispevek k zgodovini NOB (Prekmurje 1941 – 1945 and Its Contribution to the National Liberation Struggle), 1967, 1980
 Jezdec brez konja (The Rider Without a Horse), 1973
 Človek živi in umira (Man Lives and Dies), 1974
 Molčeči orkester (the Silent Orchestra), 1981
 Košček spominov na izjemne čase: Ferdo Godina (1912–1994) (A Piece of Memory of Extraordinary Times: Ferdo Godina (1912–1994)), 1994

For Young Readers 
 Pravljica o logarnici (The Story of the Forest Hut), 1962
 Škoda za zdravje, če se ljudje prepirajo (It's bad for Your Health When People Argue), 1962
 V logarnico je prispel ponoči čuden gost (The Strange Nigh Visitor at the Forest Hut), 1962
 Postal sem lovec na žabe (I Became a Frog Hunter), 1962
 Pri kačjih rožah v smrtni nevarnosti (Mortal Dangers at the Snake Flowers), 1962
 Lisice ne premotiš (You Can't Trick the Fox), 1962
 Razbila se je skleda z zlatim robom (The Gold-Edged Bowl Has Broken), 1962
 Strel, ki je prinesel nesrečo (The Shot That Caused the Accident), 1962
 Mož s srečo na mehurčkih (The Man With Bubbles of Luck), 1962
 Lisico smo našli (We Found the Fox), 1962
 Uharica spet v logarnici (The Owl Back At the Forest Hut), 1962
 Iskal sem moža s srečo na mehurčkih (I Looked for the Man With Bubbles of Luck), 1962
 Sezidala si bova hišico (We Shall Build a House), collection of stories 1974
 Siničke v škornju (Blue Tits in the Boot), collection of stories 1987

References

1912 births
1994 deaths
People from the Municipality of Črenšovci
Slovenian writers
Slovenian children's writers
Levstik Award laureates